TPG may refer to:

Companies 
 Geneva Public Transport, public transportation system operator in canton of Geneva, Switzerland
 TNT Post Group (TPG), a former Dutch transportation company, renamed TNT N.V. in 2005 and PostNL in 2011
 Royal TPG Post, formerly of Royal TNT Post and later Koninklijke TNT Post, a subsidiary of TNT Post Group
The Points Guy, a travel and loyalty programs website and blog
TPG Capital, a major American private equity firm
 TPG Telecom, an Australian telecommunications and IT company
 TPG (ISP), an Australian internet and virtual mobile telephone services provider

Other uses 
 Taiwan Provincial Government, the provincial government that governs Taiwan Province of the Republic of China (ROC)
 The Piano Guys, an American musical group
Third Party Grading, a term used to refer to coin grading, authentication, and encapsulation companies
 Taiping Airport, IATA code